Ijuh is a small hill village of Nauru located in the district of Ijuw, at the borders with the one of Anabar.

See also
Districts of Nauru
List of settlements in Nauru

References

Populated places in Nauru